Fred Jackson may refer to:

Fred Jackson (running back) (born 1981), American professional football running back
Fred Jackson (American football coach) (born 1950), University of Michigan assistant football coach
Fred Jackson (saxophonist) (born 1929), American R&B and jazz musician
Fred Jackson Jr. (born c. 1945), American jazz musician
Fred S. Jackson (1868–1931), U.S. Representative from Kansas

See also
Freddie Jackson (born 1956), American singer
Frederick Jackson (disambiguation)